Asia is a residential skyscraper on Brickell Key in the Brickell district of Downtown Miami, Florida, United States. The tower rises , with 36 floors. Asia was topped out in mid-2007, and was completed structurally in January 2008. It is currently the 20th-tallest building in Miami. The tower is one of several new residential developments taking place in Miami, and is a part of the city's recent Manhattanization wave. The architectural firm who designed the building was J Scott Architecture.
Asia Miami features 123 total residences serviced by 5 private elevators.

Zoned schools
Residents are zoned to Miami-Dade County Public Schools. Zoned schools include Southside Elementary School, Shenandoah Middle School, and Booker T. Washington High School.

See also

 List of tallest buildings in Miami

References

External links
 Asia on Emporis
 Asia on SkyscraperPage

Residential buildings completed in 2008
Residential skyscrapers in Miami
2008 establishments in Florida